Mitromica is a genus of small sea snails, marine gastropod mollusks in the family Costellariidae.

Species
Species within the genus Mitromica include:
 Mitromica africana (Rolàn & Fernandes, 1996)
 Mitromica calliaqua Rosenberg & Salisbury, 2003
 Mitromica carildae Espinosa & Ortea, 2018
 Mitromica christamariae Salisbury & Schniebs, 2009
 Mitromica cosmani Rosenberg & Salisbury, 2003
 Mitromica dajjami Espinosa & Ortea, 2018
 Mitromica decaryi (Dautzenberg, 1932)
 Mitromica dicksoni Rosenberg & Salisbury, 2003
 Mitromica esperanza Leal & Moore, 1993 
 Mitromica foveata (G.B. Sowerby II, 1874)
 Mitromica gallegoi Rolán, Fernández-Garcés & Lee, 2010
 Mitromica gratiosa (Reeve, 1845)
 Mitromica jeancateae (Sphon, 1969)
 Mitromica nataliae Espinosa & Ortea, 2018
 Mitromica omanensis Herrmann & Gori, 2012
 Mitromica oryza Rosenberg & Salisbury, 2003
 Mitromica solitaria (C. B. Adams, 1852)
 Mitromica surcabera Espinosa & Ortea, 2018
 Mitromica torobella Espinosa & Ortea, 2018
 Mitromica veguera Espinosa & Ortea, 2018
 Mitromica williamsae Rosenberg & Salisbury, 2003

Classification
Biota > Animalia (Kingdom) > Mollusca (Phylum) > Gastropoda (Class) > Caenogastropoda (Subclass) > Neogastropoda (Order) > Turbinelloidea (Superfamily) > Costellariidae (Family) > Mitromica (Genus)

References

 Turner H. (2001) Katalog der Familie Costellariidae Macdonald 1860 (Gastropoda: Prosobranchia: Muricoidea). Hackenheim: Conchbooks. 100 pp

External links
 Fedosov A.E., Puillandre N., Herrmann M., Dgebuadze P. & Bouchet P. (2017). Phylogeny, systematics, and evolution of the family Costellariidae (Gastropoda: Neogastropoda). Zoological Journal of the Linnean Society. 179(3): 541-626

Costellariidae